The Children Pay is a surviving 1916 American silent drama film directed by  Lloyd Ingraham and starring Lillian Gish.

Cast
 Lillian Gish as Millicent
 Violet Wilkey as Jean, her sister
 Keith Armour as Horace Craig
 Ralph Lewis as Theodore Ainsley, the girls' father
 Loyola O'Connor as Elinor Ainsley, their mother
 Alma Rubens as Editha, their stepmother
 Jennie Lee as Susan, their governess
 Robert Lohmeyer as Signor Zucca
 Carl Stockdale as Judge Mason
 Tom Wilson as Officer
 Mazie Radford (uncredited)
 Madame Sul-Te-Wan (uncredited)

See also
 List of American films of 1916
 Lillian Gish filmography

References

External links

1916 films
American silent feature films
1916 drama films
American black-and-white films
Films directed by Lloyd Ingraham
Films with screenplays by Anita Loos
Triangle Film Corporation films
Silent American drama films
Films with screenplays by Frank E. Woods
1910s American films